= Asaf İlbay =

Turkish politician

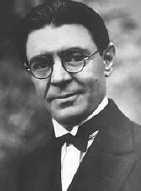
- 1920s

Member of the Grand National Assembly

Personal details
- Born: 1882 Selanik, Ottoman Empire
- Died: 1957 (aged 74–75) Istanbul, Turkey

Süleyman Asaf İlbay (1882 – 1957) was a Turkish politician, mayor of Ankara and member of parliament.
